, also known as Uchuu Ace, is a Japanese science fiction manga series written and illustrated by Tatsuo Yoshida and serialized in Shueisha's Shōnen Book magazine from June 1964 to May 1966. It was adapted into an anime television series by Tatsunoko Productions and aired on Fuji TV from May 8, 1965 to April 28, 1966. Anime Sols attempted to crowdfund the series in 2014.

Overview
Space Ace is the story of an alien young boy named Space Ace (or Ace for short), given to homesick stargazing with the faces of his loved ones ghosted across the heavens. His tool of preference is the galaxy ring, a flat white hoop he can produce from his fingers to be thrown or ride on.
The supporting cast includes Dr. Tatsunoko, who is almost a father figure to Ace, and his daughter Asari, Ace’s love interest. Providing the show's comedy relief was crusading investigative reporter Yadokari, who usually burst on the scene riding his jet skycycle at the worst possible moment, screaming for Ace to give him interviews and so on. One of the show's most important characters is "Ebo", Ace's imagined projection into the night sky depicted as a humanoid robot.

Cast
Sumiko Shirakawa as Ace
Iemasa Kayumi as Dr. Tatsunoko
Kenji Utsumi as Ibo
Kinya Aikawa as Yadokari
Mariko Mukai as Asari
Yutaka Ohyama as Dr. Montgomery

Episodes

"Birth of Ace"
"Revenge Robot"
"Earth Exile"
"Atomic Robot"
"Secret Society"
"Space Jellyfish"
"The Return of Genghis Khan"
"Space Cocoons"
"Cave Men"
"The Space Pirates"
"Space Flower"
"Space Clown"
"Invisible Monster Star"
"Song of the Mermaid"
"Ace Imposter"
"The Spaceman Who Likes Fighting"
"The Space Blob"
"Lost World"
"Fish People"
"The Time Capsule"
"Human Bomb"
"Forbidden Treasure"
"Stolen Face"
"Moon Rocket"
"Ion Drive Ring"
"Orion Raiders"
"Galaxy Conference"
"The Robot"
"The X Bomb"
"Cyborg from Orion"
"Ultra Men (Part 1)"
"Ultra Men (Part 2)"
"Youth Machine"
"Miracle Planet"
"Magic Land"
"Space Race (Part 1)"
"Space Race (Part 2)"
"The Dictator"
"Haunted Space Ship"
"Mars S.O.S."
"Time Machine"
"Robot Revolt"
"Orion Invasion"
"Space Microbes"
"Space Radio"
"Exile to Orion"
"Space Prison"
"The Space Killer"
"Telepaths"
"Space Fortress" - April 14, 1966
"Brain Missiles" - April 21, 1966
"Space War" - April 28, 1966

References

External links

Tatsunoko Production's official English website

1965 anime television series debuts
Fuji TV original programming
Shueisha franchises
Science fiction anime and manga
Animated space adventure television series
Tatsunoko Production